The Hillsboro Hops are a Minor League Baseball team in the northwest United States, located in Hillsboro, Oregon, a city in the Portland metropolitan area. The Hops are members of the Northwest League as an affiliate of the Arizona Diamondbacks. They play their home games at Ron Tonkin Field, which opened in 2013.

History

As early as 2011, the Yakima Bears, a team of the Northwest League in Yakima, Washington, started exploring options to relocate after a lack of progress on a new ballpark to replace their below-standard Yakima County Stadium and to escape a declining local economy. Following a failed proposal to move to Vancouver, Washington, the team received an offer to move to Hillsboro, Oregon, in June 2012, with plans to start play in 2013. The city and team reached a deal, with city council approval on June 5, and approval by the league and the franchise on June 8. The city signed the agreement with the team on June 26, with approval by Major League Baseball coming in August. Groundbreaking for a new 4,500-seat stadium took place on September 21, and the team's name, Hillsboro Hops, was announced on October 16. The Hops replaced the Triple-A Portland Beavers of the Pacific Coast League, who relocated to Tucson at the end of the 2010 season. The Portland area went without minor league baseball in 2011 and 2012.

The Hillsboro Hops' first game was played on the road against the Salem-Keizer Volcanoes on June 14, 2013, a 3–2 loss. Ryan Gebhardt had the team's first hit and Brian Billigen earned the first RBI. Their first win came on June 17 in the Hillsboro Ballpark home opener against the Eugene Emeralds. The inaugural home opener was attended by a sellout 4,710 fans, who watched Jordan Parr hit the first home run in the Hops' history.

Barley, the team's mascot, was introduced on June 28, 2013. The Hops set the franchise attendance record in 2014, when their games were attended by 138,732 people. They also won their division and the league championship. The team was managed by J. R. House, whose coaching staff included fellow-former major leaguers Doug Drabek and Mark Grace. Hillsboro swept the championship series against the three-time NWL defending champion Vancouver Canadians. The team set another franchise attendance record in 2015 with 143,412 (an average of 3,774 for 38 dates) while winning a second consecutive league title.

The Hops hosted the NWL All-Star Game in 2017.

On August 28, 2019, the Hops clinched a playoff berth for the sixth straight season breaking the Northwest League record previously held by Vancouver at five straight seasons. They faced the Salem-Keizer Volcanoes in the divisional round, were they won the series 2–0, and advanced to Northwest League finals for the first time since 2015. In Game 1, Hillsboro entered the bottom of the ninth inning trailing 3–1 but put up four runs in the inning including a walk-off 3-run home run by Andy Yerzy. The Hops were defeated in Game 2, losing 9–1, but bounced back in Game 3 with a two-run ninth-inning rally to snag the win. The Hops were shut out in Game 4, losing 6–0. Then in Game 5, Hillsboro captured their third NWL title, and their first since 2015, winning the series 3–2.

Due to the COVID-19 pandemic, the Minor League Baseball season was cancelled. In conjunction with Major League Baseball's restructuring of Minor League Baseball in 2021, the Hops  were organized into the High-A West along with five other teams previously of the Northwest League. They continued as the High-A affiliate of the Diamondbacks. In 2022, the High-A West became known as the Northwest League, the name historically used by the regional circuit prior to the 2021 reorganization.

In January 2023, it was announced that Veronica Gajownik had been hired to manage the Hops, which made her the first woman to manage a minor league Class High-A baseball team, and the first openly LGBTQ manager in minor or major league baseball history.

The team competes as the "Sonadores de Hillsboro" as part of minor league baseball's "Copa de Diversion" program.

Season-by-season records

Northwest League (2013–present)

The 2020 season was cancelled due to the COVID-19 pandemic.

Ballpark

The Hops play their home games at Ron Tonkin Field.

Radio
Rich Burk was signed as the team's radio announcer on KPOJ (620 AM).

Roster

Branding
The team name is a reference to the plant used in beer brewing (Oregon is the second-largest hop-producing US state by volume), as well as to various baseball terms such as the short hop, bad hop, and crow hop. No previous professional or collegiate sports team has ever been called the "Hops". The team's logo includes a hop cone wearing a baseball hat, evergreen trees, and Mount Hood. Team colors are green, navy blue, and light blue. The Hops' mascot is Barley, who is green with a blue baseball cap. (Barley is another plant used in beer brewing.) The team's branding and logo was named by Ballpark Digest as the best in Minor League Baseball for 2013.

Sponsorships
In March 2013, the team announced a three-year deal with BridgePort Brewing Company to be the official beer of the Hops.
Advantis Credit Union, Les Schwab Tires, Nike, Tuality Healthcare, and The Oregonian were the founding sponsors.

Minor league affiliations

References

External links
 
 Statistics from Baseball-Reference

 
2013 establishments in Oregon
Arizona Diamondbacks minor league affiliates
Baseball teams established in 2013
Northwest League teams
Professional baseball teams in Oregon
Sports in Hillsboro, Oregon
High-A West teams